The 2020–21 Tarleton State Texans men's basketball team represented Tarleton State University in the 2020–21 NCAA Division I men's basketball season. The Texans, led by first-year head coach Billy Gillispie, played their home games at the Wisdom Gym in Stephenville, Texas, as first-year members of the Western Athletic Conference.

The season marked Tarleton State's first year of a four-year transition period from Division II to Division I. As a result, the Texans were not eligible for NCAA postseason play and could not participate in the WAC tournament. They were eligible to play in the CIT or CBI, but were not invited.

Previous season
The Texans finished the 2019–20 season 18–12, 13–9 in Lone Star Conference  play to finish in a tie for seventh place. They received the No. 7 seed in the LSC Tournament, and defeated the No. 10 seed Texas–Permian Basin in the opening round, 84–68. They advanced to the quarterfinals where they lost to St. Edward's, 52–60.

The season marked the school's final season as a Division II school.

Roster

Schedule and results

|-
!colspan=12 style=| Non-conference regular season

|-
!colspan=12 style=| WAC regular season

|-

Source

References

Tarleton State Texans men's basketball seasons
Tarleton State
Tarleton State Texans men's basketball
Tarleton State Texans men's basketball